Kantueu Pir is a commune (khum) of Banan District in Battambang Province in north-western Cambodia.

Villages
Kantueu Pir has seven villages.

References

Communes of Battambang province
Banan District, Battambang Province